Electra (formerly, Whites Bar) is a former settlement in Amador County, California. It lay on the north bank of the Mokelumne River, at an elevation of 755 feet (230 m). Its name came from a nearby electric generating facility.

A post office operated at Electra from 1900 to 1923.

References

External links

Unincorporated communities in California
Unincorporated communities in Amador County, California